Pentaho is business intelligence (BI) software that provides data integration, OLAP services, reporting, information dashboards, data mining and extract, transform, load (ETL) capabilities. Its headquarters are in Orlando, Florida. Pentaho was acquired by Hitachi Data Systems in 2015 and in 2017 became part of Hitachi Vantara.

Overview 
Pentaho is a Java framework to create Business Intelligence solutions. Although most known for its Business Analysis Server (formerly known as Business Intelligence Server), the Pentaho software is indeed a couple of Java classes with specific functionality. On top of those Java classes one can build any BI solution.

The only exception to this model is the ETL tool Pentaho Data Integration - PDI (formerly known as Kettle.) PDI is a set of softwares used to design data flows that can be run either in a server or standalone processes. PDI encompasses Kitchen, a job and transformation runner, and Spoon, a graphical user interface to design such jobs and transformations.

Features such as reporting and OLAP are achieved by integrating subprojects into the Pentaho framework, like Mondrian OLAP engine and jFree Report. For some time by now those projects have been brought into Pentaho's curating. Some of those subprojects even have standalone clients like Pentaho Report Designer, a front-end for jFree Reports, and Pentaho Schema Workbench, a GUI to write XMLs used by Mondrian to serve OLAP cubes.

Pentaho offers enterprise and community editions of those softwares. The enterprise software is obtained through an annual subscription and contains extra features and support not found in the community edition. Pentaho's core offering is frequently enhanced by add-on products, usually in the form of plug-ins, from the company and the broader community of users.

Products

Server applications 
Pentaho Enterprise Edition (EE) and Pentaho Community Edition (CE).

Desktop/client applications

Community driven, open-source Pentaho server plug-ins 
All of these plug-ins function with Pentaho Enterprise Edition (EE) and Pentaho Community Edition (CE).

Licensing 
Pentaho follows an open core business model.  It provides two different editions of Pentaho Business Analytics:  a community edition and an enterprise edition.  The enterprise edition needs to be purchased on a subscription model.  The subscription model includes support, services, and product enhancements via annual subscription.  The enterprise edition is available under a commercial license.  Enterprise license goes with 3 levels of Pentaho Enterprise Support: Enterprise, Premium and Standard.  The community edition is a free open source product licensed under the GNU General Public License version 2.0 (GPLv2), GNU Lesser General Public License version 2.0 (LGPLv2), and Mozilla Public License 1.1 (MPL 1.1).

Recognition 
 InfoWorld Bossie Award 2008, 2009, 2010, 2011, 2012
 Ventana Research Leadership Award 2010 for StoneGate Senior Care 
 CRN Emerging Technology Vendor 2010 
 ROI Awards 2012 - Nucleus Research

See also

 Nutch - an effort to build an open source search engine based on Lucene and Hadoop, also created by Doug Cutting
 Apache Accumulo - Secure Big Table
 HBase - Bigtable-model database
 Hypertable - HBase alternative
 MapReduce - Google's fundamental data filtering algorithm
 Apache Mahout - machine learning algorithms implemented on Hadoop
 Apache Cassandra - a column-oriented database that supports access from Hadoop
 HPCC - LexisNexis Risk Solutions High Performance Computing Cluster
 Sector/Sphere - open-source distributed storage and processing
 Cloud computing
 Big data
 Data-intensive computing

References

External links
 

Business intelligence companies
Free business software
Free reporting software
Extract, transform, load tools